The Airsport Sonata is a Czech ultralight motor glider with retractable propeller, designed and produced by Airsport of Zbraslavice.

Design and development
The aircraft features a cantilever low-wing, a T-tail, a two-seats-in-side-by-side configuration enclosed cockpit, electric flaps, a retractable landing gear, and a single engine in tractor configuration.

The Sonata is made from composites. Standard engines available are the  Rotax 582 two-stroke and the  Hirth F34 powerplant.

Specifications

References

External links

2000s Czech ultralight aircraft
Single-engined tractor aircraft
Airsport aircraft